Cikampek–Purwakarta–Padalarang Toll Road or Cipularang Toll Road is a toll road on Java, Indonesia. Opened in 2005, this road connects the Jakarta–Cikampek Toll Road and the Padaleunyi Toll Road. The toll road is operated by PT Jasa Marga Tbk. The names comes from abbreviation of Cikampek - Purwakarta - Padalarang. This toll road stretches along the mountains so the track is going up and downhill and many bends and bridges.

Exits

Rest areas

Lighting 
As this toll road runs along hills that don't have access to electricity, PT Jasa Marga Tbk installs many solar street lights to brighten the road at night. Along KM 104 - 105, many solar street lights are installed on the two lanes of the road. Nevertheless, there are also some electric street lights along the toll road, such as around KM 91 and KM 95.

Road width
Generally, each lane of the toll road has only two rows because of the ground contour. But, in some narrow curves in the road, there is an extra row on the left side of each lane which is used by heavy trucks and buses.

References

Toll roads in Java
Transport in West Java